Pittenger Cottage is a historic cure cottage located at Saranac Lake, town of North Elba in Essex County, New York.  It was  built about 1920 and is a two-story wood-frame dwelling with a small two-story wing and a verandah that extends across the front facade. It features five cure porches.  It was operated as a private, registered sanatorium and boarding cottage from about 1921 to 1932.

It was listed on the National Register of Historic Places in 1992.

References

Houses on the National Register of Historic Places in New York (state)
Houses completed in 1920
Houses in Essex County, New York
Bungalow architecture in New York (state)
American Craftsman architecture in New York (state)
National Register of Historic Places in Essex County, New York